Jinghuapu Township is a rural township in Ningxiang City, Hunan Province, China.

Administrative division
The township is divided into six villages: 
 Zhangshan
 Chenjiaqiao
 Honglunshan
 Jinghuapu
 Fujiatang
 Taolinqiao

Economy
Citrus, peach and tobacco are important to the economy.

Culture
Huaguxi is the most influence form of local theatrical performance.

Transportation
China National Highway 319, Hunan Provincial Highway 1824 and some county rural roads run through the town. The 319 National Highway runs from the township to Yiyang City. The G5513 Changsha–Zhangjiajie Expressway runs through Shuangjiangkou Town, Chengjiao Township, Jinghuapu Township. The Hunan Provincial Highway 1824 from Jinghuapu Township, runs through Meitanba Town to Taojiang County.

References

External links

Divisions of Ningxiang
Ningxiang